John Stavenuiter (born 10 February 1956 in Haarlem) is a sailor from the Netherlands, who represented his country at the 1984 Summer Olympics in Los Angeles. With Guido Alkemade as crew, Stavenuiter took the 9th place in the 470.

Professional life
Stavenuiter got a BSc in Naval engineering at the Haarlem Business School (1974–1977), a MSc in Maritime Business Engineering (1985–1989) and a PhD in Asset Management Control (1997–2002) at the Delft University of Technology. He worked as Naval engineer – Head System Management (1983–2008) and as Program Director at Asset Management Control Research Foundation (2007 – present).

Sources
 
 
 
 
 
 
 
 
 
 
 
 
 
 
 
 
 

Living people
1956 births
Sportspeople from Haarlem
Dutch male sailors (sport)
Sailors at the 1984 Summer Olympics – 470
Olympic sailors of the Netherlands
20th-century Dutch people